1 Samuel 27 is the twenty-seventh chapter of the First Book of Samuel in the Old Testament of the Christian Bible or the first part of the Books of Samuel in the Hebrew Bible. According to Jewish tradition the book was attributed to the prophet Samuel, with additions by the prophets Gad and Nathan, but modern scholars view it as a composition of a number of independent texts of various ages from c. 630–540 BCE. This chapter contains the account of David's escape from Saul's repeated attempts to kill him. This is within a section comprising 1 Samuel 16 to 2 Samuel 5 which records the rise of David as the king of Israel.

Text 
This chapter was originally written in the Hebrew language. It is divided into 12 verses.

Textual witnesses 
Some early manuscripts containing the text of this chapter in Hebrew are of the Masoretic Text tradition, which includes the Codex Cairensis (895), Aleppo Codex (10th century), and Codex Leningradensis (1008). Fragments containing parts of this chapter in Hebrew were found among the Dead Sea Scrolls including 4Q51 (4QSam; 100–50 BCE) with extant verses 1–2, 8–12.

Extant ancient manuscripts of a translation into Koine Greek known as the Septuagint (originally was made in the last few centuries BCE) include Codex Vaticanus (B; B; 4th century) and Codex Alexandrinus (A; A; 5th century).

Places 

Gath
Egypt
Shur
Ziklag

David in Gath (27:1–4) 
David decided to cross over into Philistine territory to escape from Saul (verse 1), which was
immediately achieved (verse 4), and stayed as a vassal of King Achish of Gath for one year and four months (verse 7). When the first time David was in Gath, he had to feign insanity to escape (1 Samuel 21:10–15), but this time, with 600 loyal soldiers and the report of his fallout with Saul, David was well received as a group of mercenaries for the Philistines, a common practice in the ancient Near East as documented in various sources.

Verse 2 
And David arose, and he passed over with the six hundred men that were with him unto Achish, the son of Maoch, king of Gath.
"Achish, the son of Maoch": the additional identification of a father may imply this king to be different from the one David met in 1 Samuel 21. He is considered identical with Achish, son of Maachah (1 Kings 2:39).

David in Ziklag (27:5–12) 
For a brief period he and his army lived "in the royal city" with Achish (which is in Gath), but by his own request, he later settled in Ziklag, presumably was given by Achish to him in return for military service and since then became a crown property of Judean kings. From Ziklag David attacked Israel's enemies, the Geshurites, the Girzites, and the Amalekites, but giving the impression to Achish that he was attacking enemies of the Philistines. By conquering these prospective enemies and collecting booty, David actually was making preparations for his kingship.

Verse 6 
Then Achish gave him Ziklag that day. Therefore, Ziklag has belonged to the kings of Judah to this day. 
"Ziklag": allotted to the tribes of Simeon and Judah in Joshua 15:31; 19:5, but the location is unknown, some identifying it with Tell el-Khuweilfeh, north of Beersheba, others with Tell esh-Sheri 'ah, south-east of Gaza.

See also 

Related Bible parts: 1 Samuel 21, 1 Samuel 25, 1 Samuel 26

Notes

References

Sources

Commentaries on Samuel

General

External links 
 Jewish translations:
 Shmuel I – I Samuel – Chapter 27 (Judaica Press). Hebrew text and English translation [with Rashi's commentary] at Chabad.org
 Christian translations:
 Online Bible at GospelHall.org (ESV, KJV, Darby, American Standard Version, Bible in Basic English)
 1 Samuel chapter 27. Bible Gateway

27